The Taw yağı (pronounced  in Tatar) or Viryal (literally Hill Bank Land) was a historical region of Tatarstan, Khanate of Kazan, Volga Bulgaria, the name is known since the 1550s. This land was situated at the Hill, i.e. right bank of the Volga. Since 1547, this region was disintegrated from the khanate. The Feudal lords of the Hill Bank Land eventually joined Russia following 1556. Sviyazhsk was established as the center of the Hill Bank Land. Later, this part of the former khanate was incorporated to Sviyazhsk Uyezd. The region had multiethnic population and included Tatars, Chuvashes, Hill Mari and Mordvins.

During the Russian Civil War, White guerrillas were based in the forests here.

This part of Tatarstan is well known by its rocky hills. The hills themselves became recently known for their dachas, resorts and Alpine skiing.

See also
Arça yağı

References

Khanate of Kazan
Geography of Tatarstan
Russo-Kazan Wars